France-Antilles is a daily, French-language newspaper published in Guadeloupe and Martinique. The newspaper is owned by Groupe Hersant Média. France-Antilles. It also publishes a sister publication in French Guiana, France-Guyane.The newspaper was created in 1964 and published its first edition on March 24, 1964. Aude-Jacques Ruettard became owner of the newspaper in June 2017. The Commercial Court of Fort-de-France has announced its liquidation on January 30, 2020.

References

External links
France-Antilles

Newspapers published in Guadeloupe
Newspapers published in Martinique